Dëbëlldeh is a village in the municipality of Vitia, Kosovo.

Etymology 
The name of the village comes from the Serbian words "Debeli Deo" which translated into English mean "Thick Place"

Geography 
The village is located in the Karadak Mountain range, northwest of Kopilaq Mountain. It borders the village of Mjak in the west and Tanuševci in the south which is located in North Macedonia.

History 
The inhabitants of the village belong to the same clan originating from the Berisha tribe and are separated into two branches; The Mahalla of Fejzalar with nine families, and the Mahalla of Qorroll with thirteen families.

During the Kosovo War, most of the village was burned down and property was looted by Serb Forces

During the Conflict in Macedonia in 2001, the village became a stronghold of the NLA, from which many attacks on Macedonian forces were conducted. Following an agreement between Serbia and Montenegro and Macedonia the village alongside Mjak were supposed to be given to Macedonia, the idea was given up after local residents from Dëbëlldeh and Mjak rose up to arms and threatened to start a new conflict, the locals were supported by ANA militants and former NLA commanders such as Xhezair Shaqiri

Notes and references 
Notes:

References:

References

Villages in Viti, Kosovo